Antonio 'Tony' D'Alberto (born 9 December 1985) is an Australian professional racing driver. He currently drives the No.11 Ford Mustang GT for Dick Johnson Racing as a co-driver in the Bathurst 1000.

Racing career

Formula Ford

D'Alberto began his career in the early 2000s running a Formula Ford in his home state of Victoria, making a brief appearance in the 2002 Australian Formula Ford Championship.

V8 Supercar Development Series
2003 saw D'Alberto venture into V8Supercars for the first time, stepping into a John Faulkner Racing Commodore at the third round of the second tier Konica V8 Supercar Series held at Eastern Creek Raceway. In just his sixth race he had climbed into the top ten at Phillip Island and finished his first partial season with a fifth place overall at the series final at Mallala Motor Sport Park.

Joining the Independent Racing Cars team for 2004 D'Alberto evolved into a regular top ten runner, but podiums eluded him as he raced to eighth place in the championship. That first podium came, though, on the biggest stage at the non-championship round held as a support race for the 2004 Bathurst 1000, driving a Ford Falcon for the first and thus far only time he gave his temporary Howard Racing team a third-place finish.

Tony D'Alberto Racing was formed around the developing racer and a serious attempt for the champion was run for the first time in the 2005 season and he claimed third places at the Adelaide Street Circuit, Eastern Creek and Bathurst rounds of the championship on his way to fifth place. His form, however, did translate to his first invite to race in the main series endurance races and he stepped into the second Tasman Motorsport Commodore but did not finish either enduro.

2006 was frustrating for D'Alberto as the team expanded to a second car for Mark McNally but slid backwards and apart from again starring at the Bathurst round, heading for the familiar third place, was absent from the Fujitsu Series podiums, although the enduros this year saw him join the championship winning team HSV Dealer Team although a confused driver swapping situation with Holden Racing Team saw D'Alberto deposited into the combined squads fourth car and results were not strong.

Series champion
2007 would see a season long battle between a revitalised Tony D'Alberto Racing team and the big new team in the Fujitsu series, the Jim Morton run Ford team, Ford Rising Stars Racing and its lead driver Michael Caruso. Second at the Adelaide Clipsal 500 round lead to his first race win at Wakefield Park Raceway in the third race of the weekend, which also gave him his first round win, and the points lead as Caruso faltered. Consistent seconds and a third at Winton gave D'Alberto another round win, but Queensland Raceway was a miss-step and Caruso gained ground. Owen Kelly took over the Oran Park Raceway round as D'Alberto slid to sixth for the round but it was worse for Caruso. Bathurst, too, was a mixed result, but Caruso gained ground as Luke Youlden took the win. At the Phillip Island finale Caruso reigned supreme but a late race collision with Dale Wood saw D'Alberto limp to the line for the first race in ninth place. A repaired Commodore raced home to fifth position, more than enough to secure the crown despite Caruso's race win.

In the 2007 enduro season might have looked modest as D'Alberto joined the smallest team in the series, the Independent Race Cars run Rod Nash Racing Commodore driven by Steve Owen. Eleventh place had been a good result at the 2007 Sandown 500 but the team starred at Bathurst. Despite the team's relative lack of resources they were involved in the fight at the fringe of the lead pack in the desperate, rain-affected final stage of the race and Owen brought the car home in a superb sixth position.

Supercars Championship

Tony D'Alberto Racing ran under the Rod Nash Racing franchise for the team's first assault on the V8 Supercar Championship Series in 2008, fulfilling the team's long held ambitions. While a long running court case over past ownership of the No. 55 franchise threw some doubt over the team's entry in that series, it was able to compete in all events in the 2008 championship.
In 2013, under the new Car of the Future rules, D'Alberto drove the Walkinshaw Racing-backed No. 3 VF Commodore under the standalone team of Tony D'Alberto Racing. Although his success was limited, with his best race results being a 4th at Winton, and a 4th at Surfers Paradise (with co-driver Jonny Reid), D'Alberto finished the Championship season in 16th place, his best result yet.

In 2014, due to insufficient sponsorship and funding, Tony D'Alberto Racing sold their car and equipment to Walkinshaw Racing, leaving D'Alberto without a full-time drive. D'Alberto will drive with Walkinshaw Racing's Tim Slade, as co-driver of the No. 47 VF Commodore in the enduro races in 2014.

In 2016 Tony will be joining Scott Pye in No. 17 as co-driver at DJR Penske FG X Falcon for the enduro series (Sandown, Bathurst and Gold Coast) of the V8 Supercar Championship.

Career results

Complete Bathurst 1000 results

TCR Australia results

References

External links
Tony D'Alberto Racing
V8 Supercars Official Profile
Driver Database profile
Profile on Racing Reference

Supercars Championship drivers
1985 births
Living people
Formula Ford drivers
Racing drivers from Victoria (Australia)
Australian people of Italian descent
V8SuperTourer drivers
Australian Endurance Championship drivers
Team Penske drivers
Dick Johnson Racing drivers
Mercedes-AMG Motorsport drivers
Lamborghini Squadra Corse drivers